Lydia Villa-Komaroff (born August 7, 1947) is a molecular and cellular biologist who has been an academic laboratory scientist, a university administrator, and a business woman.  She was the third  Mexican-American woman in the United States to receive a doctorate degree in the sciences (1975) and is a co-founding member of The Society for the Advancement of Chicanos/Hispanics and Native Americans in Science (SACNAS). Her most notable discovery was in 1978 during her post-doctoral research, when she was part of a team that discovered how bacterial cells could be used to generate insulin.

Early life and family

Lydia Villa-Komaroff was born on August 7, 1947, and grew up in Santa Fe, New Mexico. She was the 
eldest of six children; her father, John, was a teacher and musician and her mother, Drucilla, was a social worker. By the age of nine, Villa-Komaroff knew that she wanted to be a scientist, influenced in part by her uncle, a chemist. She was also inspired due to her mother's and grandmother's love for both nature and plants.

Education and career 
In 1965, she entered the University of Washington in Seattle as a chemistry major. When an advisor told her that "women do not belong in chemistry" she switched majors, settling on biology. In 1967, she transferred to Goucher College in Maryland, when her boyfriend moved to the Washington, D.C. metropolitan area to work at the National Institutes of Health. It is believed that she applied to Johns Hopkins University, but was not accepted because they were not accepting women at that time. In 1970, she married her boyfriend, Dr. Anthony L. Komaroff, and the couple moved to Boston.

In 1970, Villa-Komaroff enrolled at the Massachusetts Institute of Technology (MIT) for graduate work in molecular biology. Her PhD dissertation, under the supervision of Harvey Lodish and Nobel laureate David Baltimore, focused on how proteins are produced from RNA in poliovirus. She dedicated her thesis to her colleagues David Rekosh and David Housman, who she says "taught me to walk," and her advisors who "taught me what it might be like to fly."

In 1973, while still a graduate student at MIT, she became a founding member of the Society for Advancement of Chicanos and Native Americans in Science (SACNAS).

She completed her PhD at MIT in cell biology in 1975. She then went to Harvard to conduct her postdoctoral research for three years, focusing on recombinant DNA technology, under the supervision of Fotis Kafatos and Tom Maniatis. When Cambridge banned such experiments in 1976, citing worries about public safety and the chance of unintentionally creating a new disease, Villa-Komaroff moved to Cold Spring Harbor Laboratory.  While at Cold Spring Harbor, she experienced repeated failures of her experiments; however, these disappointments taught her that “most experiments fail, and that scientists must accept failure as a part of the process”.

Villa-Komaroff felt that these failures aided in her biggest victory: six months after she was able to return to Harvard (once the ban on recombinant DNA experiments was lifted in 1977), she became a postdoctoral fellow in the laboratory of Nobel laureate Walter Gilbert. Within 6 months, she was the first author of the landmark report from the Gilbert laboratory showing that bacteria could be induced to make proinsulin– the first time a mammalian hormone was synthesized by bacteria. The research was a milestone in the birth of the biotechnology industry.

Later in the same year, she joined the faculty of the University of Massachusetts Medical School (UMMS), where she was a professor for six years before being granted tenure. The following year, she left for a position at Harvard Medical School with a lighter teaching workload and more research opportunities including her research on transforming growth factor- α and epidermal growth factor during fetal and neonatal development published in 1992 and 1993. There, she continued to establish her name in molecular biology, and in 1995 a television documentary called "DNA Detective" featured her work on insulin-related growth factors. The segment ran as part of a six-part PBS series on women in science, under the umbrella title "Discovering Women."

In 1996, Villa-Komaroff left laboratory research, and was recruited to Northwestern University where she served as vice president for Research of the university. In 2003 she returned to Boston, where she became the Vice President for Research and Chief Operating Officer of Whitehead Institute in Cambridge, Massachusetts, an affiliated research institute of MIT. Since 2005, she has served as a senior executive and board member of several biotechnology companies.  She also continues to serve on the boards and committees of several major public and private institutions.

Research discoveries and accomplishments

After her participation in the landmark research reporting the first synthesis of mammalian insulin in bacterial cells, Villa-Komaroff used the then-new molecular biology technology of recombinant DNA to address a number of fundamental questions in different fields, in collaboration with neurologists, developmental biologists, endocrinologists, and cell biologists. 
Villa-Komaroff's laboratory made several important contributions following the insulin research.

The laboratory identified several proteins that help vision develop in very young animals. Other scientists had discovered that the development of normal vision in cats is delayed when cats are raised in total darkness and that the development of vision can be triggered by brief exposure to light. Villa-Komaroff's laboratory showed that exposing dark-reared cats to one hour of light caused a 2 to 3 fold transient induction of three specific proteins.  This finding directly linked the expression of these genes with an environmental trigger (light) in the development of vision.

The laboratory also discovered direct evidence that the Gap-43 protein was important in the growth of the axons of nerve cells.

Finally, Villa-Komaroff contributed to the discovery that a molecule known to be associated with Alzheimer's disease (amyloid beta) causes degeneration of brain cells (neurons), work done in conjunction with a postdoctoral fellow in her laboratory, Bruce Yankner. Before this publication, it was unclear whether amyloid beta was a byproduct of neuronal degeneration or a contributor to that degeneration. This paper provided the first direct evidence that a fragment of the amyloid precursor protein could kill neurons, and helped stimulate a very large field dedicated to preventing and treating Alzheimer's disease by targeting amyloid beta.

Awards and honors
1992 Hispanic Engineer National Achievement Award
1994 Invited participant in the 1994 Forum on Science in the National Interest - White House Office of Science and Technology Policy
1999 Induction into the Hispanic Engineer National Achievement Hall of Fame
2008 Catalyst Award - Science Club for Girls
2008 Hispanic Scientist of the Year, Museum of Science and Industry (Tampa)
2008 Lifetime Achievement award, Hispanic Business Media
1996-2011 Honorary Doctoral Degrees, Goucher College, University of Saint Thomas (Minnesota), Pine Manor College, and Regis College (Massachusetts), 
2011 Leadership Award, Women Entrepreneurs in Science & Technology
2012 MAKERS selection, and video, as a prominent woman leader
2013 Woman of Distinction, American Association of University Women (AAUW)
2014 Distinguished Lecturer for the STEM Diversity Institute and the Five Colleges, Inc
2015 Distinguished Women Scientist, White House Office of Science and Technology Policy
2016 Morison Prize, MIT Program in Science, Technology & Society
2017 Honorary Co-Chair, March for Science
 2017 Storied Women of M.I.T.

Past positions
Member of Advisory Council for the National Institute of Neurological Disorders and Stroke
Member of Biology Directorate for the National Science Foundation
Member of the Institute of Medicine Committee on Assessing the System for Protecting Human Research Subjects
Member of the National Research Council (United States) Committee on the Structure of NIH
Member of the congressionally mandated National Science Foundation Committee on the Equal Opportunity in Science and Engineering
Board of directors, American Association for the Advancement of Science, 2001-2005
Member of the Board, Transkaryotic Therapies, 2003-4
Chair of the Board, Transkaryotic Therapies, 2005
Founding member, Board member, Vice President of the Society for the Advancement of Chicanos and Native Americans in Science
Chair, Board of Trustees, Pine Manor College, 2007
Member of the US delegation to the Asian-Pacific Economic Conference-Women and the Economy Forum, 2012

Current positions
National Research Council (United States) Standing Committee on Women in Science, Engineering, and Medicine (CWSEM)
National Research Council (United States) Committee on Underrepresented Groups
National Research Council (United States) Committee on the Expansion of the Science and Engineering Workforce Pipeline
Member of the Board, Massachusetts Life Sciences Center
Member of the Board, ATCC (company), (Chair of the Executive Committee)
Member of the Board of Trustees, Keck Graduate Institute, The Claremont Consortium, Claremont California
Member of the Board, Biomedical Careers Program
Fellow of the Association for Women in Science
Fellow of the American Association for the Advancement of Science

References

External links
 Lydia Villa-Komaroff  Video produced by Makers: Women Who Make America
 

Living people
American women academics
Women molecular biologists
1947 births
Goucher College alumni
American molecular biologists
Hispanic and Latino American scientists
20th-century American women scientists
21st-century American women scientists
20th-century American scientists
21st-century American scientists